Providence Dyeing, Bleaching, Calendring Company (or Valley Bleachery) is an historic industrial complex located at 46,50,52,60 Valley Street and 80 Delaine Street in Providence, Rhode Island.  It consists of 18 small-to-medium-sized brick and stone structures in a parcel  in size, between Valley Street and the Woonasquatucket River. Although most of these buildings were constructed between 1900 and 1920, the oldest building in the complex is a single-story rubble stone structure which may contain elements of an 18th-century mill structure, and is known to have achieved its present form around 1837.  The original water privilege for this mill site was granted to Christopher Olney in 1773 for a paper mill.

The complex was listed on the National Register of Historic Places in 2004.

See also
National Register of Historic Places listings in Providence, Rhode Island

References

Industrial buildings completed in 1837
Industrial buildings and structures on the National Register of Historic Places in Rhode Island
Buildings and structures in Providence, Rhode Island
National Register of Historic Places in Providence, Rhode Island